Coronation Street is a British soap opera, initially produced by Granada Television. Created by writer Tony Warren, Coronation Street first broadcast on ITV on 9 December 1960. The following is a list of characters introduced in the show's third year, by order of first appearance.

For the majority of the first half of 1962, Coronation Street was caught up in the midst of a strike by the actors' union Equity, which began in November 1961 and meant members could not sign new contracts for the duration. As a result, the show was forced to rely on just fourteen regular cast members for five months, as those actors had previously signed year-long contracts, a rarity in television at the time. The strike caused regulars such as Emily Nugent (Eileen Derbyshire), Leonard Swindley (Arthur Lowe) and, later, Dennis Tanner (Philip Lowrie) to disappear from screens and no new characters were introduced until the strike ended in April.

Series producer Derek Granger departed the show in April, and was replaced by H.V. Kershaw in his first of eight separate stints in the role over the next ten years. With the strike over, most of the cast lost at the end of 1961 returned to their respective roles, and in July Kershaw introduced kind-hearted young builder Jerry Booth, played by Graham Haberfield. Jerry would become a major character for the next thirteen years until Haberfield's sudden death in 1975. August saw the Street's second birth as Christopher Hewitt was born to parents Concepta and Harry, and long-term recurring character Dave Smith made his first appearance in September.

Philippa Scopes

Philippa Scopes is the glamorous girlfriend of Billy Walker. Billy's mother Annie takes an instant dislike to the leggy blonde, and her presence certainly catches the eye of many of the male regulars. An aspiring actress, Philippa refuses to give up her luxurious lifestyle for Billy, and ends the relationship before heading back to London.

Colin Appleby

Colin Appleby is introduced in June as an old boyfriend of Christine Hardman's whom she bumped into while on a night out with Sheila Birtles. The chance encounter leads to a whirlwind romance and Colin and Christine are wed only days later on 20 June 1962. They leave for London that night, but in October Christine returns alone — Colin having sadly been killed in a car accident, leaving her a widow in only her twenties.

Phyllis Gregory

Phyllis Gregory is the wife of Bill Gregory who appeared seeking a reconciliation with him, causing complications for Bill and his lover Elsie Tanner. Bill was forced to choose between the two women, and he waited for a sign from Elsie to tell him to end his marriage. When none came, Bill agreed to try again with Phyllis and they left the Street together. By 1970, Phyllis had died, and although it took them 22 years, Bill and Elsie did end up together.

Jerry Booth

Gerald William "Jerry" Booth is played by Graham Haberfield. Jerry is introduced in July 1962 as Len Fairclough's new apprentice at the builder's yard, and the men soon become firm friends. Initially, Jerry pursues and falls for Sheila Birtles but Sheila becomes infatuated with her new boss Neil Crossley the next year and forgets about Jerry. Although they briefly split, Neil and Sheila later go on to marry after leaving the street.

Jerry meets Myra Dickenson in 1963. Not long after getting together, Myra pushes Jerry into proposing and Jerry went along with her plans. Jerry and Myra marry in October 1963, only a couple of months after meeting, and move into number thirteen after their honeymoon. However, with Myra playing housewife and overspending on luxuries, they find they can not survive on just Jerry's income and the bills start to pile up. The message eventually reached Myra of the trouble they were in and she broke down. Myra organised with her parents that the couple would move in with them until they can sort out their finances. The Booths left Weatherfield in May 1964.

Jerry returns in February 1965, having split from Myra. He revealed that Myra was pregnant when they left but their baby girl was stillborn and the devastation drove them apart. In 1966, Jerry almost finds happiness again when former flame Sheila returns to the area but is put off when he learns of Sheila and Neil's life together and of their son Danny. In 1968, Myra returns in hope of a reconciliation but Jerry is adamant he has moved on, and continues divorce proceedings as Myra returns to her parents'. Jerry eventually becomes a partner in Len's building company but ends the partnership  when he unexpectedly left for a fresh start after being best man at Dennis Tanner's wedding. Jerry returns in 1971 and Len offers him his old job back. Jerry eventually moves in with Len and Ray Langton to help keep the house in order.

Mavis Riley enters Jerry's life in 1973, and they become good friends. Jerry and Mavis develop feelings for each other but they are both too shy to admit it and the timing is never quite right. The blossoming romance comes to an abrupt end when tragedy strikes. Jerry dies suddenly of a heart attack in November 1975 aged just thirty-four, due to the real-life sudden death of actor Graham Haberfield, who had played Jerry for thirteen years. Jerry's friends and neighbours are left in a state of shock and sadness.

Sam Leach

Sam Leach is Jerry Booth's uncle who turns up from Newcastle, and soon gets a job as potman in the Rovers. Jack provides him with a bed at the Rovers, but Sam's appearance puzzles Jerry who wonders why he's left his aunt. He impresses the locals with his acts of charity until the police turn up looking for him. The locals speculate on the reasons why, believing he may have killed his wife Maureen. In fact he is only wanted for deserting her, and returns home.

Christopher Hewitt

Christopher Hewitt is the child born to Harry and Concepta Hewitt in 1962, played by child actor Stephen Ward. His mother's pregnancy causes a stir in the Street as most believe Concepta, at 34 years of age, is too old to have a baby. However, his birth comes as a joy to everyone. To mark the Hewitt's first wedding anniversary, they throw a party in the Rovers to celebrate but the celebrations are cut short when Christopher is abducted from outside Swindley's shop. Three days later Elsie Tanner bumps into one of her daughter Linda's school friends Joan Akers and was surprised to find her with a baby. Recognizing the child as Christopher, Elsie rings the police. Joan is arrested and Christopher is returned safely. The Hewitt family, minus Lucille, leave the Street in 1964.

Dave Smith

Dave Smith is a bookmaker and small-town businessman played by actor Reginald Marsh on a recurring basis between 1962 and 1976. Dave is introduced as owner of the local bookies when he appears for two episodes in September 1962. Dave is immediately interested in Elsie Tanner and he invites her to go on holiday with him. Elsie returns a couple of weeks later, having got bored of Dave's company.

Dave returned in 1966 and made sporadic appearances for the next ten years. He made his final appearance in 1976, leaving Weatherfield to go to Kenilworth with Blanche Hunt, an old flame to run a country club.

Joan Akers

Joan Akers was a school friend of Linda Cheveski's who abducted Christopher Hewitt. Joan's baby died a year before and after Christopher was returned to his mother, she begged her forgiveness but Concepta refused.

Susan Schofield

Susan Schofield was a pupil of Bessie Street School where Albert Tatlock served as a lollipop man. Albert grew concerned with Susan when he noticed she was frequently covered in bruises, and befriended her. When asked about her home life, Susan broke down and admitted that her father was violent. Following a visit to Susan's house by Albert, her father Jim threatened him, but Albert refused to back down. With the support of the men of Coronation Street, they made their own threat to Jim to call the police if the violence continued. Two years later, in 1964, Susan was knocked down and killed by a lorry on Rosamund Street.

Others

References

1962
, Coronation Street
Coronation Street